Joseph Miller Huston (February 23, 1866 – 1940) was an architect notable for designing the third (and current) Pennsylvania State Capitol in Harrisburg.  Construction started in 1902 of his Beaux-Arts design.  He was one of five people convicted of graft in 1910 after a state investigation of cost overruns in association with construction and furnishing the capitol.

Early life and education
Joseph Miller Huston was born in Philadelphia, Pennsylvania in 1866.  When he was seventeen, Joseph joined the firm of Frank Furness and Sons, where he worked during his college years. He graduated from Princeton University in 1892, re-joining Furness' firm full-time.

Career
In 1895, Huston founded his own firm, and began designing buildings in Philadelphia, such as the Witherspoon Building, (1895).  In 1898–99, Huston toured Europe and Asia, along with his older brother, Samuel, experiencing historic styles which greatly influenced his later designs.

Pennsylvania State Capitol . In 1901, at the age of 36, Joseph Huston won the design competition for the commission for the new Pennsylvania State Capitol over eight other competitors. His design was overwhelmingly heralded as a success. At its dedication on October 4, 1906, President Theodore Roosevelt described the building as, " ... the handsomest State Capitol I ever saw!"  The total cost of the project was nearly triple what the legislature had appropriated, in part because of inflated costs for construction and furnishings due to the state's purchasing mechanism. Huston, and four other officials were convicted of graft in 1910 and sentenced to up to two years in prison for their parts in the overruns. Although he appealed, Huston lost his case and went to the Eastern State Penitentiary in 1911.

Huston's home, known as Oaks Cloister (c.1904) is located in the Germantown section of Philadelphia and has been described as one of the finest residences in the city. The Huston family sold the property in 1955 and it fell into disrepair over time and ultimately was abandoned. This venerable landmark was saved from demolition in 2002 by Dr. Russell Harris and Mr. John Casavecchia, who spent the following decade restoring the mansion to its original glory.

In 1911, Huston designed the Searles Memorial Methodist Church, now located in the Old Pottstown Historic District.

References 

1866 births
1940 deaths
Architects from Philadelphia
Princeton University alumni
19th-century American architects
20th-century American architects